{{Infobox film
| name           = Tip Top
| image          = Tip Top (film).jpg
| caption        = Film poster
| director       = Serge Bozon
| producer       = 
| writer         = Odile BarskiSerge BozonAxelle Ropert
| based_on       = {{based on|Tip Top|Bill James}}
| starring       = Sandrine KiberlainIsabelle Huppert
| music          = Roland Wiltgen
| cinematography = Céline Bozon
| editing        = François Quiqueré
| distributor    = Rézo Films
| released       = 
| runtime        = 106 minutes
| country        = FranceBelgium
| language       = FrenchArabic
| budget         = $4 million
| gross          = $625,000
}}Tip Top'' is a 2013 Franco-Belgian detective comedy film directed by Serge Bozon and starring Isabelle Huppert. The story was adapted from the novel of the same name by Bill James, under the pseudonym David Craig. It was screened in the Directors' Fortnight section of the 2013 Cannes Film Festival.

Plot
Two urban female internal affairs inspectors join the police department of a small village in order to investigate the murder of an Algerian man who was an informant.

Cast
 Sandrine Kiberlain as Sally Marinelli
 Isabelle Huppert as Esther Lafarge
 François Damiens as Robert Mendès
 Samy Naceri as Gérald
 Karole Rocher as Virginie
 François Négret as Nadal
 Aymen Saïdi as Younès
 Elie Lison as Rozynski
 Saïda Bekkouche as Saida Bekkouche

See also
 Isabelle Huppert on screen and stage

References

External links
 

2013 films
2010s comedy mystery films
French comedy mystery films
2010s French-language films
Films set in France
Films shot in Belgium
Films shot in Luxembourg
Films directed by Serge Bozon
2013 comedy films
2010s French films
French-language Belgian films